Ovicides is a genus of worms belonging to the family Carcinonemertidae.

The species of this genus are found in Pacific Ocean.

Species:

Ovicides davidi 
Ovicides jasoni 
Ovicides jonesi 
Ovicides julieae 
Ovicides paralithodis

References

Nemerteans